Jeziorzany may refer to the following places:
Jeziorzany, Lesser Poland Voivodeship (south Poland)
Jeziorzany, Lublin Voivodeship (east Poland)
Jeziorzany, Masovian Voivodeship (east-central Poland)